Iserlohn (Westphalian: Iserlaun) is a city in the Märkischer Kreis district, in North Rhine-Westphalia, Germany. It is the largest city by population and area within the district and the Sauerland region.

Geography
Iserlohn is located at the north end of the Sauerland near the Ruhr river, in West-Central Germany.

History
The Pancratius church (also called Bauernkirche) is believed to have been founded in around 985, but the first written document mentioning lon dates only from 1150. In 1237 the Count of the Mark gave Iserlohn municipal rights. In 1975 the city, which had been an urban district before, incorporated the surrounding ex-municipalities of Letmathe, Hennen, Sümmern and Kesbern, and became part of the district "Märkischer Kreis". As a larger mid-sized city, Iserlohn, however, still has a special status compared to most other municipalities in the district. This means that the city takes on tasks more usually performed by the district, such as social and youth affairs, hence it is comparable to an urban district.

Politics

Mayor
The current mayor of Iserlohn is Michael Joithe, a member of the voter group Die Iserlohner. The most recent mayoral election was held on 13 September 2020, with a runoff held on 27 September, and the results were as follows:

! rowspan=2 colspan=2| Candidate
! rowspan=2| Party
! colspan=2| First round
! colspan=2| Second round
|-
! Votes
! %
! Votes
! %
|-
| bgcolor=| 
| align=left| Eva-Barbara Kirchhoff
| align=left| Christian Democratic Union
| 13,275
| 39.8
| 11,912
| 49.8
|-
| bgcolor=#648C5A| 
| align=left| Michael Joithe
| align=left| Die Iserlohner
| 5,273
| 15.8
| 12,007
| 50.2
|-
| bgcolor=| 
| align=left| Martin Luckert
| align=left| Social Democratic Party
| 5,015
| 15.0
|-
| bgcolor=| 
| align=left| Manuel Huff
| align=left| The Left
| 2,864
| 8.6
|-
| bgcolor=| 
| align=left| Martin Isbruch
| align=left| Alliance 90/The Greens
| 2,692
| 8.1
|-
| bgcolor=| 
| align=left| Daniel Bläsing
| align=left| Alternative for Germany
| 1,608
| 4.8
|-
| bgcolor=| 
| align=left| Claudio Vurro
| align=left| Independent
| 1,521
| 4.6
|-
| 
| align=left| Hans Herbers
| align=left| Independent Voters' Association
| 592
| 1.8
|-
| bgcolor=| 
| align=left| Martin Radojcic
| align=left| Independent
| 233
| 0.7
|-
| bgcolor=| 
| align=left| Robert Gustävel
| align=left| Independent
| 194
| 0.6
|-
| bgcolor=| 
| align=left| Michael Klammt
| align=left| Independent
| 129
| 0.4
|-
! colspan=3| Valid votes
! 33,396
! 99.2
! 23,919
! 98.3
|-
! colspan=3| Invalid votes
! 279
! 0.8
! 419
! 1.7
|-
! colspan=3| Total
! 33,675
! 100.0
! 24,338
! 100.0
|-
! colspan=3| Electorate/voter turnout
! 72,958
! 46.2
! 72,849
! 33.4
|-
| colspan=7| Source: City of Iserlohn (1st round, 2nd round)
|}

City council
The Iserlohn city council governs the city alongside the Mayor. The most recent city council election was held on 13 September 2020, and the results were as follows:

! colspan=2| Party
! Votes
! %
! +/-
! Seats
! +/-
|-
| bgcolor=| 
| align=left| Christian Democratic Union (CDU)
| 11,817
| 35.6
|  3.6
| 24
|  4
|-
| bgcolor=| 
| align=left| Social Democratic Party (SPD)
| 6,337
| 19.1
|  13.3
| 13
|  3
|-
| bgcolor=#648C5A| 
| align=left| Die Iserlohner
| 4,397
| 13.2
| New
| 9
| New
|-
| bgcolor=| 
| align=left| Alliance 90/The Greens (Grüne)
| 3,713
| 11.2
|  4.3
| 8
|  5
|-
| bgcolor=| 
| align=left| The Left (Die Linke)
| 2,498
| 7.5
|  0.5
| 5
|  1
|-
| bgcolor=| 
| align=left| Alternative for Germany (AfD)
| 1,985
| 6.0
|  0.2
| 4
|  1
|-
| bgcolor=| 
| align=left| Free Democratic Party (FDP)
| 1,483
| 4.5
|  0.4
| 3
|  1
|-
| 
| align=left| Independent Voters' Association (UWG)
| 960
| 2.9
|  0.7
| 2
|  1
|-
| bgcolor=| 
| align=left| Independent Radojcic
| 43
| 0.1
| New
| 0
| New
|-
! colspan=2| Valid votes
! 33,233
! 98.8
! 
! 
! 
|-
! colspan=2| Invalid votes
! 420
! 1.2
! 
! 
! 
|-
! colspan=2| Total
! 33,653
! 100.0
! 
! 68
!  18
|-
! colspan=2| Electorate/voter turnout
! 72,958
! 46.1
! 
! 
! 
|-
| colspan=7| Source: City of Iserlohn
|}

Points of interest
The Dechenhöhle caves were discovered in 1868 during the construction of the railway line Hagen-Iserlohn. 360 metres are accessible for visitors, and there are many stalactites and stalagmites in the cave.

The Danzturm, located on the southern hill overlooking the old city, is a landmark and featured on the logo of the local brewery (Iserlohner). The tower has views of the valley and surrounding hills and is open to the public with a small inn at the base.

In the 18th century, the town became known for its Iserlohn boxes, a form of tobacco or snuff box with an engraved or embossed lid that often featured an image of former Prussian King Frederick the Great.

Sports
The city is home of the Iserlohn Roosters, a DEL (first-division) ice hockey team. The Roosters joined the DEL in 2000 and developed from a low-budget team to a solid one that regularly competes for a Playoff-spot. The club plays its home games at the Eissporthalle Iserlohn, which holds 4,967 spectators. The original club, EC Deilinghofen, was founded in 1959 and went bankrupt in 1987. The second club, ECD Sauerland, existed from 1988 to 1994. In 1994, Iserlohner EC was founded.

Education
Iserlohn has 15 elementary schools and 12 secondary schools (3 Gymnasien, 1 Gesamtschule, 3 Realschulen, 5 Hauptschulen).

Two universities of applied sciences are also located in the city. The headquarters, together with a major branch, of the South Westphalia University of Applied Sciences (also: Fachhochschule Südwestfalen (FH SWF)) offering engineering and informatics programmes is located in the city centre on Alexanderhöhe. The Business and Information Technology School (BiTS) is a private, state-approved business school with a campus near the Seilersee.

Schützenfest
The Schützenfest is a famous festival which takes place every year, and is central to Iserlohner's cultural life - and the town's identity. It is held at the Parkhalle, Alexanderhöhe.

At the same time as the Shooters festival (Schützenfest) the Iserlohn Peace committee  (FriedensPlenum) has held a 3 day free benefit  music festival around the farmers church (Bauernkirche) since 1991.

Coat of arms
Iserlohn's coat of arms features, in the middle, Saint Pancras (St. Pancratius), who is patron of the oldest church in Iserlohn. He is depicted between two towers of the historic city wall. The checked fess below the saint is derived from the arms of the Counts of the Mark.

Twin towns – sister cities

Iserlohn is twinned with:

 Almelo, Netherlands (1954)
 Biel/Bienne, Switzerland (1959)
 Hall in Tirol, Austria (1967)
 Auchel, France (1975)
 Laventie, France (1975)
 Nyíregyháza, Hungary (1989)
 Novocherkassk, Russia (1990)
 Glauchau, Germany (1991)
 Chorzów, Poland (2004)

Notable people

Johann Stephan Pütter (1725–1807), Reichspublizist and teacher of state law
Friedrich Soennecken (1848–1919), businessman, entrepreneur, inventor and graphic artist
Alexander Pfänder (1870–1941), philosopher
Karl Rasche (1892–1951), SS honor and rank leader for special use with the rank of Obersturmbannführer and board member and spokesman of the Dresdner Bank
Wilhelm Wessel (1904–1971), painter
Curt Rechel (1902–1973), Navy officer 
Walter Bosse (1904-1979), artist, designer, and potter
Richard Friederich Arens (1919–2000), mathematician
Gerd Roellecke (1927–2011), jurist and legal philosopher
Aloys Kontarsky (1931–2017), pianist
Alfons Kontarsky (1932–2010), pianist
Bernhard Kontarsky (born 1937), conductor and pianist
Jochen Busse (born 1941), actor and cabaret artist
Helmut Neuhaus (born 1944), historian on Early modern period
Harm Klueting (born 1949), Roman Catholic clergyman, historian, theologian and university lecturer
Volker Fischer (born 1950), fencer
Ulrich Walter (born 1954), astronaut
Gordon Brown (1958–2020), sculptor
Timothy Paul Evans (born 1962), British general lieutenant and commander of the ARRC
Matthias Mellinghaus (born 1965), rowing sportsman, film director and assistant director, Olympiasieger 1988
Marsha Wattanapanich (born 1970), Thai singer and actress
Markus Giesler (born 1976), consumer researcher
Marc Mclellan (born 1978), Author
 (born Soner Duman) (born 1983), rapper
Thore Schölermann (born 1984), actor
Dieter Orendorz (born 1992), ice hockey player
David Beckmann (born 2000), car racing driver
Monty Don (born 1955), 
gardener
Matteo Di Lorenzo (born 2007), model

References

Further reading
 Götz Bettge: Iserlohn-Lexikon. Iserlohn 1987. .
 Ernst Dossmann: Iserlohner Tabaksdosen erzählen. Ein Einblick in die wirtschaftlichen, gesellschaftlichen, politischen und militärischen Verhältnisse und das Aufblühen von Gewerbe, Industrie und Handel im märkisch-westfälischen Wirtschaftsraum während der Regierungszeit Friedrichs des Großen, dargestellt an bekannten Iserlohner Industrieerzeugnissen. 1981. .
Margret Kirchhoff: Pulsschläge einer Stadt. Die Oberste Stadtkirche Iserlohn – Zeitbilder und Momentaufnahmen. 2003. Eigenverlag Dr. Margret Kirchhoff.
Fritz Kühn: Liebes altes Iserlohn. (released about 1956). Westfalenverlag Dortmund
 Peter Müller und Günter Stalp: Unsere gute alte Straßenbahn. Eine Reise in die Vergangenheit. Iserlohn 1995. .
 Hans-Herbert Mönnig Verlag Iserlohn (no author mentioned): Iserlohn – unsere lebendige Stadt. Ein Bildband von Iserlohnern für Iserlohner. Iserlohn 1997. .
 Heinz Stoob (†): Westfälischer Städteatlas; Band: I; 9 Teilband (Stadtmappe Iserlohn). Im Auftrage der Historischen Kommission für Westfalen und mit Unterstützung des Landschaftsverbandes Westfalen-Lippe; edited by Heinz Stoob and Wilfried Ehbrecht. Dortmund-Altenbeken, 1975. .

External links

 
Newspaper Iserlohner Kreisanzeiger und Zeitung 

 
Towns in North Rhine-Westphalia
Märkischer Kreis
Members of the Hanseatic League